The Most Precious Order of Princely Heritage is an order of merit of Antigua and Barbuda recognising invaluable service to Antigua and Barbuda, the Caricom region or the international community in any field of heritage and other cultural endeavours. It was established and constituted by the Parliament of Antigua and Barbuda under the National Honours Act 1998. which received royal assent  from the Governor General of Antigua and Barbuda on 31 December 1998.

History 
The Order of Princely Heritage was established and constituted under the National Honours Act 1998, which was amended in 2000, 2001 and 2015.

Composition 
The Order is composed of the Sovereign, Chancellor and five classes of members, in descending order of precedence, as follows:
 Grand Cross (GCH)
 Grand Officer (GOH)
 Commander (CH)
 Officer (OH)
 Member (MH)
The Governor General of Antigua and Barbuda is ex officio Chancellor of the Order. Membership is open to citizens of Antigua and Barbuda and citizens of other countries.

Officers 
The Order has four officers who compose the Chancery of the Order, as follows:
 Chancellor
 Secretary General
 Antigua Herald
 Barbuda Herald

Appointments 
Appointments to the Order are made by the Chancellor on the advice of the Prime Minister of Antigua and Barbuda and the Honours Committee established under the 1998 Act. The Honours Committee consists of a person appointed by the Governor General of Antigua and Barbuda, two Members of the Senate of Antigua and Barbuda and four Members of the House of Representatives of Antigua and Barbuda. The Governor General appoints the Chairperson of the Honours Committee from amongst its members.

Posthumous appointments to the Order may be made, but a deceased recipient does not appear on the current list of members of the Order.

New appointments are announced each year on the occasion of the Independence Day of Antigua and Barbuda (1 November). The Chancellor conducts investitures at Government House in St John's.

Precedence and privileges 
Members of the order are assigned a place in the order of precedence of Antigua and Barbuda. Members are also entitled to place post-nominals after their names indicating the appropriate class of the order to which they have been appointed. 

Grand Crosses may petition for heraldic supporters to be granted to their arms. They may also encircle their arms with a circlet bearing the motto of the Order. Grand Officers and Commanders may encircle their arms with the circlet. The pendent insignia of the Order may be shown below the arms of all members of the Order.

Notable recipients
Maurice Hope, GCH
Claudette Peters, OH

See also 
 Order of the National Hero (Antigua and Barbuda)
 Order of the Nation (Antigua and Barbuda)
 List of post-nominal letters (Antigua and Barbuda)
 Orders and decorations of the Commonwealth realms

References 

Orders, decorations, and medals of Antigua and Barbuda
Awards established in 1998
1998 establishments in Antigua and Barbuda